African Portraits is a solo piano album by Abdullah Ibrahim. It was recorded in 1973 and released by Sackville Records. Parts of the original release were later issued on compilation albums.

Recording and music
The album was recorded in Toronto on 18 February 1973. Material from the recording session was released on this album and on Sangoma.

Releases and reception

African Portraits was released by Sackville Records. The AllMusic reviewer concluded that, "There are many recordings available by the unique pianist, and this set is an above-average and consistently stirring effort." The Penguin Guide to Jazz observed that the recording was "in dramatic close-up".

Material from African Portraits and Sangoma was later compiled in the album Ancient Africa, which was released by Sackville in 1994. A 2017 CD reissue of this compilation added a previously unreleased track featuring Ibrahim on flute as well as reciting words. It was issued by Delmark Records, which had earlier acquired the Sackville catalogue.

Track listing
"Cherry/Bra Joe from Kilimanjaro" – 21:18
"Blues for Hughie/Kippie/Gafsa – Life Is for the Living, Death Is for All of Us/Gwangwa/Little Boy/Easter Joy/Jabulani/Xaba – 24:10

Personnel
Abdullah Ibrahim – piano

References

1973 albums
Abdullah Ibrahim albums
Solo piano jazz albums